China Aviation Industry Corporation II (AVIC II) was a Chinese consortium of aircraft manufacturers. The consortium was created on July 1, 1999, by splitting the state-owned consortium China Aviation Industry Corporation (AVIC) into AVIC I and AVIC II. AVIC I was mainly focused on large planes, while AVIC II was mainly focused on smaller planes, such as trainers (JL-8, utility aircraft (licensed version of Cessna 208 Caravan), L-15, and CJ-6), small passenger airliners (Harbin Y-12), medium range transport aircraft (Y-8), and helicopters (Z-8, Z-9, WZ-10 and Z-11). On October 28, 2008, the companies officially consolidated back into one organization to more efficiently manage resources and avoid redundant projects.

Subsidiaries
 Changhe Aircraft Industries Corporation
 Harbin Aircraft Manufacturing Corporation
 Hongdu Aviation Industry Corporation
 Shaanxi Aircraft Company
 Shijiazhuang Aircraft Industry Co. Ltd

See also
 Aviation Industry Corporation of China
 People's Liberation Army Air Force
 China Aviation Industry Corporation I (AVIC I) 
 China Aerospace Science and Technology Corporation
 Commission of Science, Technology and Industry for National Defense
 China Northern Industries
 China Shipbuilding Industry Corporation
 China State Shipbuilding Corporation
 List of Chinese aircraft
 List of Chinese aircraft engines

References

Aircraft manufacturers of China
Defence companies of the People's Republic of China
Holding companies established in 1999
Chinese companies established in 1999
Defunct government-owned companies of China
1999 establishments in China